The 2012 Tour de Singkarak was the 4th edition of the Tour de Singkarak, one of Indonesian official tournament series of Union Cycliste International (UCI). It started on 4 June in Sawahlunto and ended in the Padang on 10 June. Like previous edition, the international cyclists competed in 7 stages over 7 days, which the routes has been surveyed by Amaury Sport Organization which surveyed also Tour de France routes. Covering a distance of 854 kilometres with prize money total to IDR 1 billion. The route across Lake Singkarak on stage 2 and stage 5.

Starting in Sawahlunto and finishing in provincial capital Padang, the race visited 14 regencies and cities in the West Sumatra: Sawahlunto, Payakumbuh, Lima Puluh Kota, Sijunjung, Tanah Datar, Padang Panjang, Pariaman, Agam, Solok, Solok Regency, Pariaman, Pesisir Selatan, and Padang.

Difference 
Different from organization of the Tour de Singkarak in previous years which always start from the city of Padang, this year's Tour de Singkarak actually began in Sawahlunto, one of the best old city in Indonesia. While the city of Padang as the capital of West Sumatra, as a finish place Tour de Singkarak, after previously placed in Lake Singkarak. However, Lake Singkarak and other famous objects remain a part of this year trajectory pathway, which length is 854 km. These differences occurred caused this championship has cooperated with the Amaury Sport Organization or ASO, organizers of the Tour de France in France.

Teams 
As of 29 May 2012:

  Action Cycling Team
  Aisan Racing Team
  Australian National Team
  Azad University Cross Team
  CCN Cycling Team
  Colossi Miche Team
  Eddy Hollands Bicycle Services
  Genesis Wealth Advisers Pro
  Global Cycling Team
  Japan Cycling Federation
  Mess Kerman Cycling Team
  OCBC Singapore Continental
  Plan B Racing Team
  Reine Blanche
  Trengganu Pro
  Uzbekistan Suren Team

  Binong Baru Pesisir Selatan
  Cikeas Cycling Team
  Custom Cycling Club
  Pengprov ISSI Sumatera Barat
  Polygon Sweet Nice
  PSN Gillas
  Putra Perjuangan
  Wimcycle Araya
  WPS Management Jogja

Stages

References

External links
 Official site Tour de Singkarak

Tour de Singkarak
Tour de Singkarak
Tour de Singkarak